Joseph Patrick "Joe" Downey (January 17, 1865 – 1926) was an Ontario journalist and political figure. He represented Wellington South in the Legislative Assembly of Ontario from 1902 to 1911 as a Conservative member.

He was born in Puslinch Township, Canada West, the son of Patrick Downey. He served as editor for the Guelph Herald from 1885 to 1907. Downey married Ellen Josephine Coghlan in 1893. In 1910, he was appointed superintendent for the Ontario Asylum for Idiots (later the Huronia Regional Centre). Downey died in Orillia in 1926.

References
Canadian Parliamentary Guide, 1910, EJ Chambers

External links 
Orillia Museum of Art and History: July 2007 newsletter (pdf)
Memories of Mount Forest and surrounding townships ..., AW Wright (1928)
Member's parliamentary history for the Legislative Assembly of Ontario

1865 births
1926 deaths
Progressive Conservative Party of Ontario MPPs
People from Wellington County, Ontario
Canadian newspaper editors
Canadian male journalists